José Fors Fierro (born 30 July 1958) is a Cuban singer and artist best known as the leading member of the bands Cuca and Forseps.

Biography
Fors was born in Havana, Cuba, in 1958. At the age of three he and his family moved to Miami, Florida where he studied painting. In 1967 his family moved to Mexico City, where he lived for the remainder of his childhood. Later on he moved again to Guadalajara where he has lived most of his life. In 1976 he studied anatomical drawing with Robert Martinez and started working with musical groups such as Mask and Lepra. In 1985 he developed an ambitious project with Carlos Esegé (née Carlos Sanchez-Gutierrez) called Duda Mata. In 1994 he left Cuca to initiate a new project, Forseps. In 2004 Cuca returned to the stage and recorded a live record on 14 May 2004. In 2005 he returned to the studio to record the album Con Pelotas. Fors currently lives in Guadalajara.

Discography

With Mask 
  The Fox , 1985

With Duda Mata 
  Duda Mata , 1987

With Cuca 
  La Invasión de los Blátidos , 1992
  Tu Cuca Madre Ataca de Nuevo , 1993
  El Cuarto de Cuca , 1997
  Viva Cuca , 2004
  Con Pelotas , 2006
  La Venganza De Cucamonga ,2016
  semen , 2017

With Forseps 
 , 1995
 .02, 2000
 333: El Despertar del Animal, 2002
 , 2002
 Forseps IV, 2004
 José Fors Forseps 5 , 2008

 Others 
  Frankenstein: The Rock Opera , 2009
  Orlok: The Rock Opera , 2012

 Connected Culebra 1996, 1996 (Cuca: 'La Balada' and 'Toma') Red Hot + Latin: Silencio = Muerte, 1997 ('' featuring Youth Brigade)Operación Código Rojo, 2004 ('Señalado y apartado' and 'Todos somos portadores')Tokin Records Kompilado.2os, 2004 ('Dulce Violencia')Hellboy Soundtrack, 2004 ('Hellboy')La Otra Navidad'', 2005 ('Mi regalo de navidad' and 'Otra navidad')

References 

1958 births
Living people
People from Havana
Artists from Guadalajara, Jalisco
Cuca (band) members
Mexican musicians
Musicians from Miami